Iman University (also al-Iman University, el-Eman University, or al-Eman University; ; Jāmiʿat al-Īmān) is a Sunni religious school founded in 1993 in Sanaa, Yemen. Al-Iman means the Faith.

As of January 2010, it reportedly had  6,000 students.

Its founder and principal director is Abdul-Majid al-Zindani, who is classified by the US Treasury as a Specially Designated Global Terrorist, and who is also under sanction by the United Nations. In 2004, he was designated a terrorist associated with al-Qaeda by both the U.S. and the United Nations. He was co-founder of Islah (a Yemeni opposition party) and was  theological adviser to Osama bin Laden.

The statement made by the U.S. Treasury mentions that some students at Iman University have been arrested for political and religious murders. Some believe that the school's curriculum deals mostly, if not exclusively, with Islamist studies, and that it is an incubator of extremism.  Students are suspected of having assassinated three American missionaries, and "the number two leader for the Yemeni Socialist Party", Jarallah Omar. John Walker Lindh, now serving a 20-year prison sentence in connection with his participation in Afghanistan's Taliban army, is a former student of the university.

After fighting in the city in September 2014, the new Huthi masters in San‘a’ closed the Al-Iman University.

References

External links

 Iman University 
 Iman University (Archive)
 Anwar al Awlaki: Pro Al-Qaida Ideologue with Influence in the West

Universities in Yemen
Islamic universities and colleges
Madrasas
Islamic organizations based in Yemen